"Loud" is a song by American rapper Mac Miller, and the lead single from his mixtape Macadelic (2012). It was written by Miller, Eric Dan, Jeremy Kulousek, and Zachary Vaughan, and produced by Big Jerm and Sayez. It was released on March 2, 2012, by Rostrum Records. The music video was released on March 23, 2012.

Background and release
"Loud" was written by Mac Miller, Eric Dan, Jeremy Kulousek, and Zachary Vaughan, and produced by Big Jerm and Sayez at ID Labs. The song was released digitally by Rostrum Records on March 2, 2012, as the lead single from Miller's mixtape Macadelic (2012).

Music video
The music video for "Loud" was released on March 23, 2012, the same day Macadelic was released. Directed by Ian Wolfson, the video includes Miller rapping his verse alongside several masked dancers in a dark-lit studio. At the beginning of the video, Miller sips from a glow-in-the-dark cup that says "Don't Do Drugs".

Remix
A remix of "Loud", featuring British rapper Benny Banks, was released by Rostrum Records on May 28, 2012.

Track listing

Charts

Weekly charts

Certifications

References

2011 songs
2012 singles
Mac Miller songs
Rostrum Records singles
Songs written by Mac Miller